Arthur Edward Hext Wright  (7 February 1886 – 13 November 1970) was an English first-class cricketer and Royal Navy officer.

The son of the cricketer Edward Wright and his wife Constant Hext, he was born in February 1886 at Georgetown in British Guiana. He was educated in England at the Britannia Royal Naval College, graduating into the Royal Navy as a sub-lieutenant in September 1905. He was promoted to the rank of lieutenant in June 1908. Wright later appeared in a single first-class cricket match for the Royal Navy against the British Army cricket team at Lord's in 1914. Batting twice in the match, he was dismissed for 30 runs in the navy first-innings by Hervey Lawrence, while in their second-innings he made a half century, scoring 57 runs before being dismissed by Francis Wyatt. He served in the Royal Navy in the First World War, during which he was promoted to the rank of lieutenant commander in July 1916. 

Following the war, Wright was awarded the Distinguished Service Order in March 1920 for distinguished services in the Baltic with the 2nd Destroyer Flotilla, with promotion to the rank of commander coming in December of the same year. Wright played minor counties cricket for Devon in 1921, making three appearances, before making a final appearance in 1923. He was placed on the retired list at his own request in May 1932, at which point he was granted the rank of captain. He was recalled to service shortly before the Second World War and was placed as the naval officer in charge of the Humber in August 1939, before being appointed as a maintenance captain in Liverpool. In April 1942, he was appointed to command the shore establishment . Wright died in November 1970 at Chudleigh, Devon.

References

External links

1886 births
1970 deaths
Sportspeople from Georgetown, Guyana
Graduates of Britannia Royal Naval College
Royal Navy officers
English cricketers
Royal Navy cricketers
Royal Navy personnel of World War I
Companions of the Distinguished Service Order
Devon cricketers
Royal Navy personnel of World War II